Lü Ju (died 12 November 256), courtesy name Shiyi, was a military general of the state of Eastern Wu during the Three Kingdoms period of China. He was the second son of Lü Fan, a general who served under Sun Quan, the founding emperor of Wu. In 252, following Sun Quan's death, Wu's rival state, Wei, sent an army to invade Wu, leading to the Battle of Dongxing. Lü Ju participated in the battle alongside the Wu regent Zhuge Ke and general Ding Feng, and defeated the enemy. In 256, he got into conflict with the Wu regent Sun Chen and committed suicide after being cornered by the latter's forces.

See also
 Lists of people of the Three Kingdoms

Notes

References

 Chen, Shou (3rd century). Records of the Three Kingdoms (Sanguozhi).
 Pei, Songzhi (5th century). Annotations to Records of the Three Kingdoms (Sanguozhi zhu).
 Sima, Guang (1084). Zizhi Tongjian.

Year of birth unknown
256 deaths
Eastern Wu generals
Generals under Sun Quan
Chinese politicians who committed suicide
Suicides in Eastern Wu